Gottfried Glöckner (born 24 June 1937) is a German composer, choral conductor and music educator.

Life 
Born in Chemnitz, Glöckner attended the Zwickau Conservatory. Afterwards he worked as a music teacher in Bad Liebenwerda and Frankfurt (Oder). From 1970 to 1974 he studied composition with Manfred Weiss at the Hochschule für Musik Carl Maria von Weber in Dresden. He worked as a freelance composer and choral conductor in Frankfurt (Oder). His Concerto for Orchestra was first performed in Havana in 1984.

He was married to the writer Helga Glöckner-Neubert until her death in 2017.

Awards 
 1986: Hanns Eisler Prize

Compositions 
 Alle Kinder können sich verstehen for children' choir and piano 
 Bratschenstücke (Viola pieces) for viola and piano (2011)
 Concertino for accordion and wind quintet
 Erste Liebe for medium voice and piano
 Flötentrio for flutes
 Fünf Intermezzi for clarinet and piano
 Kleine Suite for accordion solo
 Konzert für Orchester
 Musik zur Weihnachtszeit for small ensemble
 Philosophen und die Liebe for medium voice and piano
 Präludium und Passacaglia
 Sieben Stücke for horn and piano
 Sonata for flute and piano
 Sonatine for clarinet and piano

References

External links 
 
 Werke von Gottfried Glöckner at Verlag Neue Musik
 Gottfried Glöckner at Bellmann Musikverlag

1937 births
Living people
People from Chemnitz
20th-century German composers
20th-century classical composers
German music educators